1921 Championship of the Soviet Ukraine was the first  football tournament conducted in the Soviet Ukraine. Its final portion, starting from the quarter-finals, took place in the capital city of Kharkiv.

Quarter-finals

Semifinals

Final

Kharkiv: Vinnykov, Levin, Natarov,  Shpakovsky, Bem, Bizyaev, Alfyorov, Kapustin, Varzheninov, Makeyev, Ordin, Kazakov, Romanenko, Lazunenko.

References
Championship of the Soviet Ukraine

Championship of the Soviet Ukraine, 1921
1921 in Ukraine
Football Championship of the Ukrainian SSR